= Pine Meadow, Lexington =

Neighborhood in Lexington, Kentucky

Coordinates: 38.043°N 84.536°W

Pine Meadow is a neighborhood in southwestern Lexington, Kentucky, United States. Its boundaries are Mason Headley Road to the west, Pine Meadow Park to the north, Addison Park to the east, and the Campbell House golfcourse to the south.

Neighborhood statistics

- Area: 0.219 square miles (0.57 km^{2})
- Population: 842
- Population density: 3,850 people per square mile
- Median household income: $25,684
